The Players Series (officially the Duelbits Series) is a bonus competition for players who have earned the most money in a series of professional snooker tournaments. The series involves three events: the World Grand Prix, Players Championship and Tour Championship. It was established in 2019.

Overview
In the 2018–19 and 2019–20 seasons, the series was sponsored by Coral and was called the Coral Cup. In the 2020–21 and 2021–22 seasons, it was sponsored by Cazoo and named the Cazoo Series. In the 2022–23 season, it was sponsored by crypto casino Duelbits and named the Duelbits Series. With the exception of the 2019–20 season, there has been no monetary bonus for earning the most money over the three events: the only winner of an additional monetary bonus was Stephen Maguire, who gained £100,000 for earning the most money in the series, most of the earnings having come from winning the 2020 Tour Championship, the highest earning event in the series.

Unlike traditional ranking events, qualification is based on results from the single season list, rather than by world rankings. The number of competitors for each event shortens, with 32 players participating in the Grand Prix, 16 in the Players Championship, and 8 in the Tour Championship. The series was sponsored and named after betting company Coral, until 2021, when car retailer Cazoo took over sponsorship. The player who earns the most in prize money over the series is awarded with a prize fund of £100,000 and the "Coral Cup". This bonus was only introduced in the 2019/2020 season.

For the 2021/22 season, players who lose in the first round of any of the Cazoo Series events receive ranking points equalling their prize money. This is a change from previous incarnations where losing in the first round gave prize money only and no ranking points. However, should a player qualify for one of the events in the series, but does not play their opening match, the player receives neither prize money nor ranking points. World Snooker later confirmed that this change would apply to the 2022-23 snooker season.

Winners

Finals

Statistics

Champions

References

 
Snooker competitions in the United Kingdom

Snooker tours and series
Recurring sporting events established in 2019